The 2022–23 Nashville Predators season is the 25th season for the National Hockey League franchise that was established on June 25, 1997.

Standings

Divisional standings

Conference standings

Regular season

|- style="background:#cfc;"
| 1 || October 7 || San Jose Sharks || 4–1 || || Saros || O2 Czech Republic || 16,648 || 1–0–0 || 2 || 
|- style="background:#cfc;"
| 2 || October 8 || @ San Jose Sharks || 3–2 || || Lankinen || O2 Czech Republic || 17,023 || 2–0–0 || 4 || 
|- style="background:#fcc;"
| 3 || October 13 || Dallas Stars || 1–4 || || Saros || Bridgestone Arena || 17,692 || 2–1–0 || 4 || 
|- style="background:#fcc;"
| 4 || October 15 || @ Dallas Stars || 1–5 || || Saros || American Airlines Center || 18,532 || 2–2–0 || 4 || 
|- style="background:#ffc;"
| 5 || October 18 || Los Angeles Kings || 3–4 || SO || Saros || Bridgestone Arena || 17,159 || 2–2–1 || 5 || 
|- style="background:#fcc;"
| 6 || October 20 || @ Columbus Blue Jackets || 3–5 || || Lankinen || Nationwide Arena || 14,691 || 2–3–1 || 5 || 
|- style="background:#fcc;"
| 7 || October 22 || Philadelphia Flyers || 1–3 || || Saros || Bridgestone Arena || 17,470 || 2–4–1 || 5 || 
|- style="background:#cfc;"
| 8 || October 27 || St. Louis Blues || 6–2 || || Saros || Bridgestone Arena || 17,159 || 3–4–1 || 7 || 
|- style="background:#fcc;"
| 9 || October 29 || Washington Capitals || 0–3 || || Saros || Bridgestone Arena || 17,159 || 3–5–1 || 7 || 
|-

|- style="background:#fcc;"
| 10 || November 1 || @ Edmonton Oilers || 4–7 ||  || Saros || Rogers Place || 16,812 || 3–6–1 || 7 || 
|- style="background:#cfc;"
| 11 || November 3 || @ Calgary Flames || 4–1 || || Lankinen || Scotiabank Saddledome || 16,984 || 4–6–1 || 9 || 
|- style="background:#cfc;"
| 12 || November 5 || @ Vancouver Canucks || 4–3 || SO || Saros || Rogers Arena || 18,855 || 5–6–1 || 11 || 
|- style="background:#fcc;"
| 13 || November 8 || @ Seattle Kraken || 1–5 || || Saros || Climate Pledge Arena || 17,151 || 5–7–1 || 11 || 
|- style="background:#fcc;"
| 14 || November 10 || @ Colorado Avalanche || 3–5 || || Lankinen || Ball Arena || 18,134 || 5–8–1 || 11 || 
|- style="background:#cfc;"
| 15 || November 12 || New York Rangers || 2–1 || || Saros || Bridgestone Arena || 17,169 || 6–8–1 || 13 || 
|- style="background:#cfc;"
| 16 || November 15 || Minnesota Wild || 2–1 || || Saros || Bridgestone Arena || 17,159 || 7–8–1 || 15 || 
|- style="background:#cfc;"
| 17 || November 17 || New York Islanders || 5–4 || || Saros || Bridgestone Arena || 17,159 || 8–8–1 || 17 || 
|- style="background:#ffc;"
| 18 || November 19 || Tampa Bay Lightning || 2–3 || OT || Saros || Bridgestone Arena || 17,444 || 8–8–2 || 18 ||
|- style="background:#cfc;"
| 19 || November 21 || Arizona Coyotes || 4–3 || SO || Saros || Bridgestone Arena || 17,159 || 9–8–2 || 20 || 
|- style="background:#fcc;"
| 20 || November 23 || @ Detroit Red Wings || 0–3 || || Lankinen || Little Caesars Arena || 19,515 || 9–9–2 || 20 || 
|- style="background:#ccc;"
| — || November 25 || Colorado Avalanche || colspan="8"|Postponed due to a water main break at Bridgestone Arena.  Moved to April 14.
|- style="background:#ccc;"
| — || November 26 || Columbus Blue Jackets || colspan="8"|Postponed due to a water main break at Bridgestone Arena.  Moved to January 17.
|- style="background:#cfc;"
| 21 || November 29 || Anaheim Ducks || 2–1 || OT || Saros || Bridgestone Arena || 17,159 || 10–9–2 || 22 || 
|-

|- style="background:#cfc;"
| 22 || December 1 || @ New Jersey Devils || 4–3 || OT || Saros || Prudential Center || 14,071 || 11–9–2 || 24 || 
|- style="background:#cfc;"
| 23 || December 2 || @ New York Islanders || 4–1 ||  || Lankinen || UBS Arena || 16,263 || 12–9–2 || 26 || 
|- style="background:#fcc;"
| 24 || December 8 || @ Tampa Bay Lightning || 2–5 ||  || Saros || Amalie Arena || 19,092 || 12–10–2 || 26 || 
|- style="background:#fcc;"
| 25 || December 10 || Ottawa Senators || 2–3 ||  || Saros || Bridgestone Arena || 17,414 || 12–11–2 || 26 ||  
|- style="background:#ffc;"
| 26 || December 12 || @ St. Louis Blues || 0–1 || OT || Saros || Enterprise Center || 18,096 || 12–11–3 || 27 || 
|- style="background:#fcc;"
| 27 || December 13 || Edmonton Oilers || 3–6 ||  || Lankinen || Bridgestone Arena || 17,159 || 12–12–3 || 27 ||   
|- style="background:#ffc;"
| 28 || December 15 || @ Winnipeg Jets || 1–2 || OT || Saros || Canada Life Centre || 13,949 || 12–12–4 || 28 || 
|- style="background:#fcc;"
| 29 || December 17 || @ Colorado Avalanche || 1–3 ||  || Saros || Ball Arena || 18,131 || 12–13–4 || 28 || 
|- style="background:#cfc;"
| 30 || December 19 || Edmonton Oilers || 4–3 || OT || Saros || Bridgestone Arena || 17,558 || 13–13–4 || 30 ||  
|- style="background:#cfc;"
| 31 || December 21 || @ Chicago Blackhawks || 4–2 ||  || Saros || United Center || 15,239 ||  14–13–4 || 32 || 
|- style="background:#ffc;"
| 32 || December 23 || Colorado Avalanche || 2–3 || OT || Saros || Bridgestone Arena || 17,159 || 14–13–5 || 33 ||  
|- style="background:#fcc;"
| 33 || December 27 || Dallas Stars || 2–3 ||  || Saros || Bridgestone Arena || 17,768 || 14–14–5 || 33 ||  
|- style="background:#cfc;"
| 34 || December 30 || @ Anaheim Ducks || 6–1 ||  || Saros || Honda Center || 14,890 || 15–14–5 || 35 || 
|- style="background:#ffc;"
| 35 || December 31 || @ Vegas Golden Knights || 4–5 || OT || Lankinen || T-Mobile Arena || 18,333 || 15–14–6 || 36 || 
|-

|- style="background:#cfc;"
| 36 || January 3 || Montreal Canadiens || 6–3 || || Saros || Bridgestone Arena || 17,581 || 16–14–6 || 38 || 
|- style="background:#cfc;"
| 37 || January 5 || @ Carolina Hurricanes || 5–3 || || Saros || PNC Arena || 18,344 || 17–14–6 || 40 || 
|- style="background:#cfc;"
| 38 || January 6 || @ Washington Capitals || 3–2 || || Lankinen || Capital One Arena || 18,573 || 18–14–6 || 42 || 
|- style="background:#cfc;"
| 39 || January 9 || @ Ottawa Senators || 3–0 || || Saros || Canadian Tire Centre || 13,362 || 19–14–6 || 44 || 
|- style="background:#fcc;"
| 40 || January 11 || @ Toronto Maple Leafs || 1–2 || || Saros || Scotiabank Arena || 18,638 || 19–15–6 || 44 || 
|- style="background:#fcc;"
| 41 || January 12 || @ Montreal Canadiens || 3–4 || || Askarov || Bell Centre || 21,105 || 19–16–6 || 44 || 
|- style="background:#fcc;"
| 42 || January 14 || Buffalo Sabres || 3–5 || || Saros || Bridgestone Arena || 17,761 || 19–17–6 || 44 || 
|- style="background:#cfc;"
| 43 || January 16 || Calgary Flames || 2–1 || || Saros || Bridgestone Arena || 17,159 || 20–17–6 || 46 ||
|- style="background:#cfc;"
| 44 || January 17 || Columbus Blue Jackets || 2–1 || || Lankinen || Bridgestone Arena || 17,159 || 21–17–6 || 48 || 
|- style="background:#fcc;"
| 45 || January 19 || @ St. Louis Blues || 2–5 || || Saros || Enterprise Center || 18,096 || 21–18–6 || 48 || 
|- style="background:#cfc;"
| 46 || January 21 || Los Angeles Kings || 5–3 || || Saros || Bridgestone Arena || 17,654 || 22–18–6 || 50 || 
|- style="background:#cfc;"
| 47 || January 24 || Winnipeg Jets || 2–1 ||  || Saros || Bridgestone Arena || 17,159 || 23–18–6 || 52 || 
|- style="background:#cfc;"
| 48 || January 26 || New Jersey Devils || 6–4 || || Saros || Bridgestone Arena || 17,164 || 24–18–6 || 54 || 
|-

|- style="background:#fcc;"
| 49 || February 7 || Vegas Golden Knights || 1–5 || || Saros || Bridgestone Arena || 17,159 || 24–19–6 || 54 || 
|- style="background:#cfc;"
| 50 || February 11 || @ Philadelphia Flyers || 2–1 || OT || Saros || Wells Fargo Center || 19,412 || 25–19–6 || 56 || 
|- style="background:#fcc;"
| 51 || February 13 || Arizona Coyotes || 2–4 || || Lankinen || Bridgestone Arena || 17,159 || 25–20–6 || 56 || 
|- style="background:#fcc;"
| 52 || February 16 || Boston Bruins || 0–5 || || Saros || Bridgestone Arena || 17,159 || 25–21–6 || 56 || 
|- style="background:#cfc;"
| 53 || February 18 || Florida Panthers || 7–3 || || Lankinen || Bridgestone Arena || 17,823 || 26–21–6 || 58 || 
|- style="background:#fcc;"
| 54 || February 19 || @ Minnesota Wild || 3–4 || || Saros || Xcel Energy Center || 19,255 || 26–22–6 || 58 || 
|- style="background:#cfc;"
| 55 || February 21 || Vancouver Canucks || 5–4 || SO || Saros || Bridgestone Arena || 17,161 || 27–22–6 || 60 || 
|- style="background:#cfc;"
| 56 || February 23 || @ San Jose Sharks || 6–2 || || Saros || SAP Center || 11,320 || 28–22–6 || 62 || 
|- style="background:#cfc;"
| 57 || February 26 || @ Arizona Coyotes || 6–2 || || Saros || Mullett Arena || 4,600 || 29–22–6 || 64 || 
|- style="background:#fcc;"
| 58 || February 28 || Pittsburgh Penguins || 1–3 || || Saros || Bridgestone Arena || 17,435 || 29–23–6 || 64 || 
|-

|- style="background:#cfc;"
| 59 || March 2 || @ Florida Panthers || 2–1 || || Lankinen || FLA Live Arena || 16,660 || 30–23–6 || 66 || 
|- style="background:#cfc;"
| 60 || March 4 || @ Chicago Blackhawks || 3–1 || || Saros || United Center || 18,942 || 31–23–6 || 68 || 
|- style="background:#ffc;"
| 61 || March 6 || @ Vancouver Canucks || 3–4 || SO || Saros || Rogers Arena || 18,525 || 31–23–7 || 69 || 
|- style="background:#fcc;"
| 62 || March 9 || @ Arizona Coyotes || 1–4 || || Saros || Mullett Arena || 4,600 || 31–24–7 || 69 || 
|- style="background:#cfc;"
| 63 || March 11 || @ Los Angeles Kings || 2–1 || SO || Lankinen || Crypto.com Arena || 18,230 || 32–24–7 || 71 || 
|- style="background:#cfc;"
| 64 || March 12 || @ Anaheim Ducks || 5–4 || OT || Saros || Honda Center || 15,098 || 33–24–7 || 73 || 
|- style="background:#cfc;"
| 65 || March 14 || Detroit Red Wings || 2–1 || || Saros || Bridgestone Arena || 17,644 || 34–24–7 || 75 || 
|- style="background:#;"
| 66 || March 16 || Chicago Blackhawks || || || || Bridgestone Arena || || || ||
|- style="background:#;"
| 67 || March 18 || Winnipeg Jets || || || || Bridgestone Arena || || || ||
|- style="background:#;"
| 68 || March 19 || @ New York Rangers || || || || Madison Square Garden || || || ||
|- style="background:#;"
| 69 || March 21 || @ Buffalo Sabres || || || || KeyBank Center || || || ||
|- style="background:#;"
| 70 || March 23 || Seattle Kraken || || || || Bridgestone Arena || || || ||
|- style="background:#;"
| 71 || March 25 || Seattle Kraken || || || || Bridgestone Arena || || || ||
|- style="background:#;"
| 72 || March 26 || Toronto Maple Leafs || || || || Bridgestone Arena || || || ||
|- style="background:#;"
| 73 || March 28 || @ Boston Bruins || || || || TD Garden || || || ||
|- style="background:#;"
| 74 || March 30 || @ Pittsburgh Penguins || || || || PPG Paints Arena || || || ||
|-

|- style="background:#;"
| 75 || April 1 || St. Louis Blues || || || || Bridgestone Arena || || || ||
|- style="background:#;"
| 76 || April 3 || @ Dallas Stars || || || || American Airlines Center || || || ||
|- style="background:#;"
| 77 || April 4 || Vegas Golden Knights || || || || Bridgestone Arena || || || ||
|- style="background:#;"
| 78 || April 6 || Carolina Hurricanes || || || || Bridgestone Arena || || || ||
|- style="background:#;"
| 79 || April 8 || @ Winnipeg Jets|| || || || Canada Life Centre || || || ||
|- style="background:#;"
| 80 || April 10 || @ Calgary Flames || || || || Scotiabank Saddledome || || || ||
|- style="background:#;"
| 81 || April 13 || Minnesota Wild || || || || Bridgestone Arena || || || ||
|- style="background:#;"
| 82 || April 14 || Colorado Avalanche || || || || Bridgestone Arena || || || ||
|-

|-
| 2022–23 schedule

Roster

Transactions
The Predators have been involved in the following transactions during the 2022–23 season.

Key:

 Contract is entry-level.
 Contract initially takes effect in the 2023–24 season.

Trades

Players acquired

Players lost

Signings

Draft picks

Below are the Nashville Predators' selections at the 2022 NHL Entry Draft, which was held on July 7 to 8, 2022, at Bell Centre in Montreal.

References

Nashville Predators seasons
Nashville Predators
Nashville Predators
Nashville Predators